Patrick Collins (born 1942) is an Irish former Gaelic football referee and Gaelic games administrator. Born in Athboy, County Meath, Collins refereed the All-Ireland SFC finals of 1976, 1981, 1984 and 1989. A 2014 article in Hoganstand.com noted that he is regarded as "one of the top football referees of all time".

Páidí Ó Sé appointed him as a selector when he was made manager of the Westmeath senior football team in 2003, by which time Collins had long served as secretary of the Westmeath County Board.

Collins remained involved with the Westmeath senior team under Ó Sé's successor as manager Tomás Ó Flatharta, appointed in 2005.

Collins was also county secretary in 2000 when manager Brendan Lowry received a controversial six-month ban which was later lifted.

In 2022, Martin Breheny named him among "five of the best football referees".

References

1942 births
Living people
All-Ireland Senior Football Championship Final referees
Gaelic football referees
Gaelic football selectors
Secretaries of county boards of the Gaelic Athletic Association
Westmeath County Board administrators
Westmeath county football team